Samsung GT-B3410 (also known as Delphi, Star QWERTY, Ch@t (for B3410W) and formally Samsung Corby Plus) is a mobile phone that was released in 2009 by Samsung. It has a 2 MP camera and a 2.6-inch capacitive TFT touch screen. The phone has a QWERTY keyboard and was available from October 2009.

The updated version GT-B3410W Ch@t was announced in February 2010 along with GT-S5620 Monte. It includes Wi-Fi and a new version of the TouchWiz UI.

Features
 Quad-band GSM/EDGE
 2.6-inch capacitive TFT touchscreen of QVGA resolution
 30 MB onboard storage, microSD card slot (up to 8 GB)
 2-megapixel fixed-focus camera with 4x optical zoom, QVGA@13fps video recording
 FM radio with RDS
 Find Music recognition service
 TouchWiz 1.0 and Cartoon UI (TouchWiz 2.0 in B3410W only)
 Social networking integration with direct file uploads
 Bluetooth 2.1 with A2DP, USB v.2.0
 Smart unlock
 Interchangeable rear covers
 Palringo messenger
 Onboard Google search
 Java-enabled Games
 Photo contacts
 Wi-Fi 802.11b/g (B3410W only)
 QWERTY keyboard with screen rotation.

See also
 Samsung Omnia
 iPhone

References

External links
Info about Samsung B3410 Delphi

B3410
Mobile phones introduced in 2009